Adam Matthew Cappa (born October 29, 1985) is an American contemporary Christian and rock singer-songwriter born and raised in Richmond, Indiana. Cappa released his first, full-length studio album, The Rescue, in 2012 on BEC Recordings.

Background 
Cappa ministered at Young Life meetings to high school and middle school students as well as leading youth group worship at his church. He was afforded the opportunity to pursue singing and songwriting by partnering with Jeremy Camp five years prior to the release of The Rescue. Camp secured Cappa's record deal with his (Camp's) label BEC Recordings. The first album Cappa ever made was Carry Me and the first demo song he played for Camp was "Trusting You". Cappa's second indie album is titled Love Driven. He's now working on a new EP, raising funds on Kickstarter.

Discography

Albums

Singles

Personal life 
Cappa's parents are Jeffrey Frank Cappa of Wayne County, Indiana and Susan Elizabeth Cappa née Boggs a bank vice-president. He has one older brother named Brandon Martin Cappa and a younger sister named Courtney Elizabeth Cappa.

References

External links 
 

1985 births
American performers of Christian music
Songwriters from Indiana
BEC Recordings artists
Living people
Musicians from Richmond, Indiana
21st-century American singers
21st-century American male singers
American male songwriters